Acton State Historic Site, located near Acton approximately  east of Granbury in Hood County, Texas (United States), is the grave site of Elizabeth Patton Crockett, second wife of Davy Crockett, who married him in Tennessee in 1815. She died January 31, 1860. The site also contains the graves of her son Robert and Robert's wife Matilda. A monument was erected in 1913 at Acton Cemetery over the grave of Elizabeth with money authorized by the Texas Legislature in 1911.

On January 1, 2008, Acton was transferred from the Texas Parks and Wildlife Department to the Texas Historical Commission.

See also

List of Texas State Historic Sites

References

External links
 Official website for Acton State Historic Site

Texas state historic sites
Protected areas of Hood County, Texas
Protected areas established in 1949
1949 establishments in Texas